The 2019–20 South Alabama Jaguars men's basketball team represented the University of South Alabama during the 2019–20 NCAA Division I men's basketball season. The Jaguars were led by second-year head coach Richie Riley and played their home games at the Mitchell Center in Mobile, Alabama as members in the Sun Belt Conference. They finished the season 20–11, 13–7 in Sun Belt play to finish in a tie for second place. They were set to be the No. 2 seed in the Sun Belt tournament, however, the tournament was cancelled amid the COVID-19 pandemic.

Previous season
The Jaguars finished the 2018–19 season 17–17, 8–10 in Sun Belt play to finish in eight place. They lost to Texas State in the quarterfinals of the Sun Belt tournament.

Off-season

Departures

Incoming transfers

Roster

Schedule and results

|-
!colspan=9 style=| Exhibition

|-
!colspan=9 style=| Regular season

|-
!colspan=9 style=| Sun Belt tournament
|- style="background:#bbbbbb"
| style="text-align:center"|Mar 14, 20202:00 pm, ESPN+
| style="text-align:center"| (2)
| vs. (3) Texas StateSemifinals
| colspan=5 rowspan=1 style="text-align:center"|Cancelled due to the COVID-19 pandemic
| style="text-align:center"|Smoothie King CenterNew Orleans, LA

See also
 2019–20 South Alabama Jaguars women's basketball team

References

2019-20
2019–20 Sun Belt Conference men's basketball season
2019 in sports in Alabama
2020 in sports in Alabama